Callipallene is a genus of sea spiders in the family Callipallenidae. There are more than 30 described species in Callipallene.

Species
These 38 species belong to the genus Callipallene:

 Callipallene abroliensis Lucena & Christoffersen, 2016
 Callipallene acribica Krapp, 1975
 Callipallene acus (Meinert, 1898)
 Callipallene africana Arnaud & Child, 1988
 Callipallene amaxana (Ohshima, 1933)
 Callipallene belizae Child, 1982
 Callipallene brevirostris (Johnston, 1837)
 Callipallene bullata Nakamura & Child, 1991
 Callipallene californiensis (Hall, 1913)
 Callipallene catulus Lee & Arango, 2003
 Callipallene cinto Müller & Krapp, 2009
 Callipallene conirostris Stock, 1954
 Callipallene cuspidata Stock, 1954
 Callipallene dubiosa Hedgpeth, 1949
 Callipallene emaciata (Dohrn, 1881)
 Callipallene ersei Bamber, 1997
 Callipallene evelinae Marcus, 1940
 Callipallene fallax Stock, 1994
 Callipallene gabriellae Corrêa, 1948
 Callipallene longicoxa Stock, 1955
 Callipallene margarita (Gordon, 1932)
 Callipallene micracantha Stock & J.H., 1954
 Callipallene minuta Müller & Krapp, 2009
 Callipallene novaezealandiae (Thomson, 1884)
 Callipallene ovigerosetosus (Hilton, 1942)
 Callipallene pacifica Hedgpeth, 1939
 Callipallene palpida Hilton, 1939
 Callipallene panamensis Child, 1979
 Callipallene pectinata (Calman, 1923)
 Callipallene phantoma (Dohrn, 1881)
 Callipallene producta (Sars, 1888)
 Callipallene sagamiensis Nakamura & Child, 1983
 Callipallene seychellensis Child, 1988
 Callipallene solicitatus
 Callipallene spectrum (Dohrn, 1881)
 Callipallene tiberi (Dohrn, 1881)
 Callipallene tridens Nakamura & Child, 1988
 Callipallene vexator Stock, 1956

References

Further reading

External links

 

Chelicerate genera
Articles created by Qbugbot
Pycnogonids